Eomaia ("dawn mother") is a genus of extinct fossil mammals containing the single species Eomaia scansoria, discovered in rocks that were found in the Yixian Formation, Liaoning Province, China, and dated to the Barremian Age of the Lower Cretaceous about . It is exceptionally well-preserved for a 125-million-year-old specimen. Although the fossil's skull is squashed flat, its teeth, tiny foot bones, cartilages and even its fur are visible.

Description

The Eomaia fossil shows clear traces of hair.

Eomaia scansoria possessed several features in common with placental mammals that distinguish them from metatherians, the group that includes modern marsupials. These include an enlarged malleolus ("little hammer") at the bottom of the tibia (the larger of the two shin bones), a joint between the first metatarsal bone and the entocuneiform bone in the foot which is offset further back than the joint between the second metatarsal and mesocuneiform bones (in metatherians these joints are level with each other), as well as various features of jaws and teeth.

However, E. scansoria is not a true placental mammal as it lacks some features that are specific to placentals. Eomaia had five upper and four lower incisors (much more typical for metatherians) and five premolars to three molars. Placental mammals have only up to three incisors on each top and bottom and four premolars to three molars, but the premolar/molar proportion is similar to placentals.

Eomaia, like other early mammals and living marsupials, had a narrow pelvic outlet suggesting small undeveloped neonates requiring extensive nurturing.
Epipubic bones extend forwards from the pelvis; these are not found in any placental, but are found in all other mammals, including non-placental eutherians, marsupials, monotremes and other Mesozoic mammals as well as in the cynodont therapsids that are closest to mammals. Their function is to stiffen the body during locomotion. This stiffening would be harmful in pregnant placentals, whose abdomens need to expand.

Classification

The discoverers of Eomaia claimed that, on the basis of 268 characters sampled from all major Mesozoic mammal clades and principal eutherian families of the Cretaceous, Eomaia could be placed at the root of the eutherian "family tree" along  with Murtoilestes and Prokennalestes. This initial classification scheme is summarized below.

 
In 2013, a much larger study of mammal relationships (including fossil species) was published by O'Leary et al. 
The study, which examined 4541 anatomical characters of 86 mammal species (including Eomaia scansoria), found "100% jackknife support that Eomaia falls outside of Eutheria as a stem taxon to Theria", and so could not be considered a placental or a eutherian as previously hypothesized. The results of this study are summarized in the cladogram below.

The 2013 study by O'Leary et al. is part of a debate about the age of origin of placental mammals (see discussions.

), and in all trees published in that paper Eomaia fell outside Theria (i.e., debates about the findings of O'Leary et al. have not centered on the position of Eomaia).  Meng (2014), who was a co-author on the O'Leary et al. (2013) paper, subsequently referred to Eomaia as a Eutherian but provided no analysis to support this claim. Gheerbrant et al. 2014 mentioned Eomaia in a list of Cretaceous taxa that represented "the primitive eutherian condition" but provided no analytical evidence for this claim; a similar claim was repeated by Sole et al. (2014) again without analytical support.

See also
 Evolution of mammals
 Juramaia
 Sinodelphys

References

External links

 
 

Tribosphenida
Early Cretaceous mammals of Asia
Cretaceous mammals
Transitional fossils
Fossil taxa described in 2002
Yixian fauna
Prehistoric mammal genera